BCN may refer to:

Places
 Barcelona El Prat Airport, IATA code
 an abbreviation for the city of Barcelona
 Port of Barcelona, by shortened form of the UN/LOCODE ESBCN without the country prefix
 Baja California, geographical ISO 3166 code MX-BCN
 Birmingham Canal Navigations, a network of the English canal system in Birmingham, Wolverhampton

Companies and organizations
 BCN Competicion, a Spanish Formula 3000/GP2 Series motorsport team bought by Ocean Racing Technology in 2008
 Broadcasting Corporation of Newfoundland, public radio service of Newfoundland prior to absorption into the Canadian Broadcasting Corporation in 1949
 Broadcasting Corporation of Niue, government-owned broadcaster operating Niue's only television and radio channels
 Library of Congress of Chile 
 Rinker School of Building Construction at the University of Florida, formerly abbreviated BCN

Publications and literature
 Y Beibl Cymraeg Newydd, a Welsh Bible translation
 Bi Community News, a United Kingdom magazine serving the bisexual community
 Breaking Cat News, a syndicated comic strip

Other uses
 Bicyclononyne, a small molecule used in the bioorthogonal chemistry of antibody-drug conjugates
 Board Certified in Neurofeedback, a certification administered by the Biofeedback Certification International Alliance
 Boron carbonitride, another name for heterodiamond, a superhard material
 Büro Center Nibelungenplatz, a skyscraper in Frankfurt am Main, Germany
 A model designation of the Type B videotape

See also